The Robot Hall of Fame is an American hall of fame that recognizes notable robots in various scientific fields and general society, as well as achievements in robotics technology. The organization was established in 2003 by the School of Computer Science at Carnegie Mellon University in Pittsburgh, Pennsylvania, as an acknowledgement of Pittsburgh's achievements in the field of robotics and with the aim of creating a broader awareness of the contributions of robotics in society. The idea for the Robot Hall of Fame was conceived by Carnegie Mellon School of Computer Science dean James H. Morris, who described it as a means of honoring "robots that have served an actual or potentially useful function and demonstrated real skill, along with robots that entertain and those that have achieved worldwide fame in the context of fiction." The first induction ceremony was held at the Carnegie Science Center on November 10, 2003. 34 robots – both real and fictional – have been inducted into the Robot Hall of Fame since its inception. An exhibit named Roboworld was later established at the Carnegie Science Center in June 2009, featuring a physical embodiment of the hall of fame.

From 2003 to 2010, inductees to the Robot Hall of Fame were chosen by a selected panel of jurors. The opportunity to nominate a robot for induction into the hall of fame was also made open to the public; nominators were required to submit a one-paragraph rationale explaining their selection. The voting process was altered significantly in 2012, with nominations instead being gathered from a survey of 107 authorities on robotics and divided into four categories: Education & Consumer, Entertainment, Industrial & Service, and Research. Through an online voting system, members of the public were allowed to vote for one nominee per category; only the top three nominees in each category, based on the results of the aforementioned robotics experts survey, were included on the ballot. Officials subsequently derived the final list of inductees from both the survey and the public vote. Robot Hall of Fame director Shirley Saldamarco said of the changes:

Inductees

See also
 Robotics Institute

References

External links
 
 Robot Hall of Fame at Carnegie Science Center's official website

Robotics lists
Halls of fame in Pennsylvania
Science and technology halls of fame
Carnegie Mellon University
Culture of Pittsburgh
Organizations established in 2003
Awards established in 2003
University museums in Pennsylvania